Joseph Richardson (birth registered July→September 1879 – 19 November 1904) was an English professional rugby league footballer who played in the 1900s.

Background 
Joe Richardson's birth was registered in Runcorn district, Cheshire, and his death aged 25 was registered in Runcorn district, Cheshire.

Playing career

County honours
Joe Richardson won cap(s) for Cheshire while at Runcorn RFC, including; the 3-0 victory over Lancashire at Canal Street, Runcorn on Wednesday 26 October 1904.

References

External links
Search for "Richardson" at rugbyleagueproject.org

1879 births
1904 deaths
Cheshire rugby league team players
Deaths from pneumonia in England
Rugby league five-eighths
Rugby league halfbacks
Rugby league players from Runcorn
Runcorn RFC players